Lajos Asztalos (Ljudevit Astaloš) (29 July 1889, Pécs – 1 November 1956, Budapest) was a Hungarian chess International Master, professor, and teacher of languages.

At the beginning of his career, he tied for sixth-eighth at Budapest 1911 (third HUN-ch, Zoltán von Balla and Zsigmond Barász won); tied for 7-8th at Breslau (Wrocław) 1912 (18th DSB–Congress, B tourn, Bernhard Gregory won); took second, behind Gyula Breyer, at Temesvár 1912 (fourth HUN-ch); won at Debrecen 1913 (fifth HUN-ch); tied for 8-9th at Budapest 1913 (Rudolf Spielmann won), took fifth at Mannheim 1914 (Hauptturnier A); took 4th at Vienna 1917 (Quadrangular, Milan Vidmar won), and took 5th at Kaschau 1918 (Richard Réti won).

After World War I, he moved to the Kingdom of Serbs, Croats and Slovenes (later known as Yugoslavia). In 1923, he tied for sixth-seventh in Trieste; (Paul Johner won). In 1924, he took third in Győr (7th HUN-ch, Géza Nagy won). In 1925, he took 5th in Budapest (Lovas and Sterk won), and tied for 13-14th in Debrecen (Hans Kmoch won). In 1926, he took third, behind Hermanis Matisons and Savielly Tartakower, in Bardejov (Bártfa, Bartfeld, Bardiów). In 1927 he took 4th in Kecskemét (Alexander Alekhine won).

He represented Yugoslavia in Chess Olympiads:
 In 1926, in 2nd unofficial Chess Olympiad in Budapest – team silver medal;
 In 1927, at third board in 1st Chess Olympiad in London (+4 –3 =8);
 In 1931, at second board in 4th Chess Olympiad in Prague (+7 –3 =6);
 In 1936, at fourth board in 3rd unofficial Chess Olympiad in Munich (+5 –3 =8).

In 1931, he took 13th in Bled (Alekhine won). In 1934, he took sixth in Maribor (Vasja Pirc and Lajos Steiner won). In 1935, he tied for 8-9th in Belgrade (Vasja Pirc and Borislav Kostić won). In 1938, he tied for 5-7th in Ljubljana (Kostić won).

During World War II, Astaloš played for Croatia in a match against Slovakia on first board with Ivan Vladimir Rohaček (1 : 1) in Zagreb in December 1941. He returned to Hungary in 1942. Asztalos became Vice President of the Hungarian Chess Union and Secretary of the FIDE Qualification Committee. He was a professor of philosophy and a languages teacher.

He died in Budapest during the Hungarian Revolution of 1956 against the Soviet Union.

He was awarded the International Master (IM) title in 1950 and the International Arbiter (IA) title in 1951.

He was the author of A sakkjáték elemei (Budapest 1951).

Asztalos Memorial has been held regularly in Hungary since 1958 till 1971.

Notable games
Lajos Asztalos vs Alexander Alekhine, Bled (03) 1931, French Defense: Classical, Burn Variation Morozevich Line (C11), ½–½
Lajos Asztalos vs Borislav Kostic, Bled 1931, Nimzowitsch Defense: Scandinavian, Advance Variation (B00), ½–½
Geza Maroczy vs Lajos Asztalos, Bled 1931, Four Knights Game: Spanish Variation (C49), ½–½

References

External links

1889 births
1956 deaths
People from Pécs
Hungarian chess players
Croatian chess players
Yugoslav chess players
Chess Olympiad competitors
Chess International Masters
Chess arbiters
Croatian people of Hungarian descent